Drasteria pulverosa is a moth of the family Erebidae. It is found in Russia (Siberia, Tuva) and Mongolia.

Subspecies
Drasteria pulverosa pulverosa
Drasteria pulverosa intermedia Ronkay, 1985 (southern Mongolia)

References

Drasteria
Moths described in 1969
Moths of Asia